Gerd Gruber (born April 27, 1982 in Graz) is an Austrian ice hockey defenceman currently playing for EHC Black Wings Linz in the Erste Bank Hockey League.

Gruber began his career in 1998, playing for his hometown team.  He spent a total of seven seasons with the Graz 99ers before moving to the Vienna Capitals in 2005.  He signed for Linz in 2006.

External links

1982 births
Austrian ice hockey defencemen
EHC Black Wings Linz players
Graz 99ers players
Living people
Sportspeople from Graz
Vienna Capitals players